Henry Adams Bellows (1803–1873) was a lawyer, state legislator, and jurist born in Walpole, New Hampshire October 25, 1803 to Joseph and Mary (Adams) Bellows. He was educated at the academy at Windsor, Vermont. He taught school in Walpole and studied law under William C. Bradley, being admitted to the bar in 1826. He practiced in Littleton, New Hampshire from 1828 to 1850, moving to Concord, New Hampshire. He was elected to the New Hampshire House of Representatives from Littleton in 1839.  He was subsequently elected again to the House from Concord in 1856 and 1857, and served as Chairman of the Judiciary Committee. On 23 September 1859 he was appointed associate justice to the New Hampshire Supreme Court, where he served as a justice from 1859 to 1869 and Chief Justice from 1869 until his death on March 11, 1873.

References
 New Hampshire Division of Historical Resources

External links

 
 

Members of the New Hampshire House of Representatives
New Hampshire lawyers
1803 births
1873 deaths
Chief Justices of the New Hampshire Supreme Court
19th-century American politicians
19th-century American judges
19th-century American lawyers